Frédérique Cantrel is a French television, film, stage and voice actress.

Filmography

Theater

Dubbing

External links
 

Living people
French film actresses
French television actresses
French stage actresses
French voice actresses
Year of birth missing (living people)